Tim Kawakami is an American sports journalist. He is the editor-in-chief for the San Francisco Bay Area edition of The Athletic, a subscription-based, sports journalism website. Previously, he was a sports columnist for the San Jose Mercury News. In addition to his print column, he maintained a blog, communicated on Twitter, and had a podcast series.  He was named the California Sportswriter of the Year by the National Sportscasters and Sportswriters Association in 2013. He also appeared regularly on television on Comcast SportsNet Bay Area.

Early life
Kawakami was raised in Oakland, California, and moved to Burlingame. His grandfather owned The New World-Sun, a San Francisco Japanese-language newspaper. Kawakami attended Northwestern University, where he got his start in sportswriting with The Daily Northwestern.

Career
Kawakami interned at the Philadelphia Daily News, and became their beat writer for the Philadelphia Eagles in the late 1980s. 'He joined the Los Angeles Times in 1990 and covered the Los Angeles Rams before moving to boxing in 1993. While continuing to cover boxing, he began covering UCLA Bruins men's basketball in their national title season in 1994–95. He became the beat writer for the Los Angeles Lakers in 1998–99, covering the basketball team through the Shaquille O'Neal–Kobe Bryant era. Kawakami was interested in becoming a columnist, but the Times filled their opening with T. J. Simers. Kawakami left for the Mercury in the mid-2000s, writing a Page 2 column and later a regular column.

Kawakami started his "Talking Points" blog in 2006. He once said, "I love the energy of the blog world", which The Big Lead called a rarity for a mainstream media member in 2009. He also started using Twitter in 2009, and developed a reputation for blocking users from seeing his posts for offenses such as telling him what to do, making racist comments, or laughing at him (e.g. "LOL"). He began a podcast series, “The TK Show”, in 2015, when he also began a recurring segment with Ray Ratto called "But Seriously" on Comcast SportsNet Bay Area's Yahoo SportsTalk Live.

Kawakami left The Mercury in July 2017 to become the editor-in-chief of the San Francisco Bay Area edition of The Athletic.

SFGate wrote that Bay Area media circles generally considered him to be "credible, fair, and tenacious".

References

External links
Kawakami's "Talking Points" blog

Living people
American male journalists
American sports journalists
American journalists of Asian descent
American writers of Japanese descent
People from Burlingame, California
Place of birth missing (living people)
Year of birth missing (living people)
Northwestern University alumni
Sportswriters from California
The Mercury News people